Charles Laval (17 March 1862 – 27 April 1894) was a French painter associated with the Synthetic movement and Pont-Aven School.

Laval was born in Paris, and was a contemporary and friend of Paul Gauguin and Vincent van Gogh.  Gauguin created a portrait of him in 1886 looking at one of Gauguin's ceramic sculptures, entitled Still Life with Profile of Laval.

Charles Laval and Paul Gauguin

Paul Gauguin and Laval both came to Pension Gloanec in Pont-Aven in 1886 and became friends.
In search of an exoticism that could provide the key to art, Gauguin and Laval went to Panama in 1887. To gain some subsidies, Laval performs academic portraits (all lost), using his experience received from Leon Bonnat. A series of mishaps caused Laval and Gauguin to leave Central America for the island of Martinique. There he made a small series of landscapes speckled with bright colors, that have been erroneously attributed to Gauguin in the past. Laval died of an illness complicated by tuberculosis in 1894 at the age of 32.

Charles Laval and Van Gogh

Laval’s self-portrait came about because of an agreement between Van Gogh and several of his friends. Van Gogh asked Laval, Paul Gauguin and Émile Bernard to send him a portrait, in exchange for one of his own self-portraits.

Van Gogh was impressed by Laval's contribution. He included a small drawing of the Laval portrait in a letter to Theo, in order to give his brother an idea of the painting. He described Laval's painting as powerful, distinguished and precisely one of the paintings that you talk about: that one has in one's possession before others have recognized the talent.

Selected bibliography
 John Rewald, Post-Impressionism, from Van Gogh to Gauguin, Paris, 1961
 Wladyslawa Jaworska, Gauguin and the School of Pont-Aven, Neuchatel, 1971
 Sophie Monneret, Impressionism and his era, vol. 1, Paris, 1978 1, Paris, 1978
 Karen Pope, Gauguin and Martinique, Austin, 1980
 Welsh-Bogomila Ovsharov, Vincent van Gogh & the Birth of Cloisonism, Toronto, 1981
 Victor Merlhes, Correspondence of Paul Gauguin 1872-1888, Paris, 1984
 John Loiza, How Gauguin made a wonderful discovery of Martinique, Le Carbet, 1990
 Émile Bernard, Commentaries on Art, Volume I, Paris, 1994
 Daniel Wildenstein, Sylvie Crussard, Catalogue raisonné of the work of Paul Gauguin 1873-1888, Paris, 2001

References

External links

Charles Laval paintings at the Musée d'Orsay

1862 births
1894 deaths
Painters from Paris
19th-century French painters
French male painters
Post-impressionist painters
Place of death missing
Pont-Aven painters
19th-century French male artists